Tom Black Track at LaPorte Stadium is home to the University of Tennessee Volunteers men's and women's outdoor track and field teams.  It is located in the heart of the university's campus in Knoxville, Tennessee.

History
Known commonly as Tom Black Track, the facility opened in 1966 after former Tennessee track and field coach Chuck Rohe spearheaded a drive to build a track facility for his program.  The facility is named in honor of Tom Black, a Knoxville businessman and potato chip entrepreneur (whose company was later acquired by Tom's Snacks), whose donation led to the construction of the track and stadium.  The stadium around the track was later named in honor of the LaPorte family, whose donation contributed to improvements made to the facility.

The first competition at the track was a dual meet with Alabama on April 2, 1966.  The record attendance for the facility is 9,000 for a dual meet with Villanova on April 6, 1968.

Events Hosted
Tom Black Track has been host to many important meets, including the Southeastern Conference Championships in 1967, 1969, 1978, 1986, 1993, 2003, 2010 and 2018; the USA Track & Field Championships in 1982 and 1994; and the NCAA Championships in 1969 and 1995, among many other significant meets. Tom Black Track also hosts the annual Tennessee Relays (formerly known as the Sea Ray Relays and the Dogwood Relays).

Facility specifics

Tom Black Track features an eight-lane, all-weather running surface with all field events held inside the track oval.  It has a Daktronics video/scoreboard and has lighting for night meets. Seating capacity for Tom Black Track is 7,500. Temporary seating for the 1969 NCAA Track & Field Championships boosted capacity to seat 10,000 spectators.  The facility underwent renovation in 2015 and reopened in 2017 with a new surface by Beynon Sports Surfaces and many other improvements and modifications.

Boyd Family Track & Field Center

In 2018, the Boyd Family Track & Field Center opened at Tom Black Track.  Named in honor of Tennessee graduates and track program benefactors Randy and Jenny Boyd and family, the facility provides the track program with new training, storage and meeting areas as well as new public restrooms and concessions area.

Notable athletes
Notable University of Tennessee athletes who have competed at Tom Black Track

References

Sports venues completed in 1966
Athletics (track and field) venues in Tennessee
College track and field venues in the United States
Sports venues in Knoxville, Tennessee
1966 establishments in Tennessee